London West is a federal electoral district in London, Ontario, Canada, that has been represented in the House of Commons of Canada since 1968.

Geography
The district includes the northwest part of the City of London.

In 2003, it was defined to consist of the part of the city lying north and west of a line drawn from the western limit of the city along Dingman Creek, Southdale Road West, Wharncliffe Road South, Commissioners Road East, the Canadian National Railway, the Thames River, Wharncliffe Road North, Oxford Street West and Wonderland Road North.

History

The electoral district was created in 1966 from London, Middlesex East, and from Middlesex West.

It initially consisted of the part of the City of London west of a line drawn from north to south along Adelaide Street, Dundas Street, Wellington Street and Wellington Road.

In 1976, it was redefined to consist of the part of the city west of a line drawn from south to north along Southdale Road, Wellington Road, the Thames River and the North Thames River, Dundas Street, Colborne Street, Huron Street and Richmond Street.

In 1987, it was redefined to consist of the part of the city lying north and west of a line drawn from the southern limit of the city along Wharncliffe Road South, Commissioners Road East, Wellington Road, the Thames River, the North Thames River, the Medway River, Western Road and Richmond Street.

In 1996, it was redefined to consist of the part of the city lying north and west of a line drawn from the western limit of the city along Dingman Creek, Southdale Road West, Wharncliffe Road South, Commissioners Road East, the London and Port Stanley Electric Railway, the Thames River, Wharncliffe Road, Oxford Street, Wonderland Road North and Hutton Road.

In 2003, it was given its current boundaries as described above.

This riding lost territory to London North Centre during the 2012 electoral redistribution.

Demographics
According to the Canada 2021 Census

Ethnic groups: 70.4% White, 3.2% Latin American, 5.6% Arab, 5.8% South Asian, 3.7% Black, 3.1% Chinese, 3.1% Indigenous, 1.3% West Asian, 1.1% Korean
Languages: 72.7% English, 4.2% Arabic, 3.0% Spanish, 1.8% Mandarin, 1.1% French, 1.0% Portuguese
Religions: 51.3% Christian (22.3% Catholic, 5.4% United Church, 5.1% Anglican, 2.0% Christian Orthodox, 1.7% Presbyterian, 1.4% Baptist, 1.1% Pentecostal, 12.3% Other), 9.3% Muslim, 1.6% Hindu, 35.3% None
Median income: $42,800 (2020)

Average income: $55,300 (2020)

Members of Parliament

This riding has elected the following Members of Parliament:

Election results

See also
 List of Canadian federal electoral districts
 Past Canadian electoral districts

References

Sources
Federal riding history from the Library of Parliament
 2011 Results from Elections Canada
 Campaign expense data from Elections Canada

Notes

Ontario federal electoral districts
Politics of London, Ontario